Joyce Aboussie (born 1957) is the founder and CEO of Aboussie & Associates, a consulting firm in St. Louis, Missouri She is also the founder and CEO of Telephone Contact Inc., a consulting, research and data management firm.

Career 
Aboussie has a B.A. in political science from St. Louis University. She was the national vice chair of Congressman Dick Gephardt's 1988 presidential campaign and previously served as his National Political Director. Aboussie served on the national finance boards for the presidential campaigns of Barack Obama, Hillary Clinton and Joe Biden.

In 1983, Aboussie was elected to the National Board of Directors and Governors of St. Jude Children's Research Hospital.

In 2006, the St. Louis Business Journal named Aboussie one of the "Most Influential Business Women." In 1995, she was named by the St. Louis Business Journal as one of "40 people under 40" who make a difference in St. Louis.

Also in 2006, she was elected as the first woman Chairperson of the ALSAC/St. Jude Children's Research Hospital Board of Directors and Governors.

In 2015, Aboussie was inducted under the category of Small Independent Entrepreneurship into the Entrepreneurial Hall of Fame of the Center for Entrepreneurship at Saint Louis University.

References

External links
Joyce Aboussie and Associates
Aboussie and Associates

American campaign managers
American political consultants
Living people
1957 births
Businesspeople from St. Louis
Women in Missouri politics
Missouri Democrats
21st-century American women